Zdravko Pečar (born January 12, 1950 in Maribor, Maribor, Slovenia, Yugoslavia) is a retired Yugoslav discus thrower.  He competed for his home country in the 1972 Olympics.  While competing for Brigham Young University he won the 1974 NCAA Championships.

Following his throwing career he also wrote a doctoral dissertation on artificial intelligence at the University of Maribor.

References

1950 births
Living people
Serbian male discus throwers
Yugoslav male discus throwers
Olympic athletes of Yugoslavia
Athletes (track and field) at the 1972 Summer Olympics